The Millie Fox Stakes is an Australian Turf Club Group 2 horse race for fillies and mares aged three years old and older run over the sprint distance of 1300 metres under set weights with penalties conditions at Rosehill Gardens Racecourse, Sydney, Australia in  February or early March.  Prizemoney is $200,000.

History

The race is named after Millie Fox, who had a keen interest in the sport of thoroughbreds after her husband Stan Fox bought her a horse in 1965. After her husband's death, Millie took over Nebo Lodge stables and worked successfully with trainer Brian Mayfield-Smith.

Grade
 1996–2006 - Listed race
 2007–2012 - Group 3
2013 upgraded - Group 2

Distance
 1996–2005 - 1200 metres
 2006 onwards - 1300 metres

Name
 1996–1998 - Millie Fox Stakes
 1999 - Millie Fox Plate
 2000 - Millie Fox Stakes
 2001–2002 - Millie Fox Handicap
 2003 onwards - Millie Fox Stakes

Winners

 2023 - Electric Girl
 2022 - Expat
 2021 - Subpoenaed
 2020 - Savatiano
 2019 - White Moss
 2018 - Daysee Doom
 2017 - In Her Time
 2016 - First Seal
 2015 - Catkins
 2014 - Red Tracer
 2013 - Red Tracer
 2012 - Red Tracer
 2011 - Montana Flyer
 2010 - Montana Flyer
 2009 - Neroli
 2008 - November Flight
 2007 - A Country Girl
 2006 - Wild Queen
 2005 - Tivoli Dancer
 2004 - Seances
 2003 - Gentle Genius
 2002 - Triko
 2001 - Nanny Maroon
 2000 - Verdict Declared 
 1999 - Wynciti 
 1998 - Just Like Crystal  
 1997 - Dashing Eagle 
 1996 - Chlorophyll

See also
 List of Australian Group races
 Group races

External links 
First three placegetters Millie Fox Stakes (ATC)

References

Horse races in Australia
Sprint category horse races for fillies and mares